Gamani Nanda Jayasuriya (30 April 1924 – 26 April 1998) was a Sri Lankan politician. He was the former Cabinet Minister of Health, Agriculture Development, Food and Co-operatives, a Member of Parliament and former General Secretary of the United National Party. Jayasuriya was educated at  Royal College Colombo.
He was also the Chairman of H. Don Carolis & Sons.

His cousin son Dayan Witharana is a popular singer and photographer.

See also
List of political families in Sri Lanka

References & External links

Former Ministers of the Co-operative sector 
Experimenting with political package

1924 births
Members of the 4th Parliament of Ceylon
Members of the 5th Parliament of Ceylon
Members of the 6th Parliament of Ceylon
Members of the 8th Parliament of Sri Lanka
Government ministers of Sri Lanka
Health ministers of Sri Lanka
Sri Lankan Buddhists
Alumni of Royal College, Colombo
1998 deaths
Sinhalese politicians